The 1951 All-Ireland Junior Hurling Championship was the 30th staging of the All-Ireland Junior Championship since its establishment by the Gaelic Athletic Association in 1912.

Cork entered the championship as the defending champions, however, they were beaten by Tipperary in the Munster first round.

The All-Ireland final was played on 14 October 1951 at Nowlan Park in Kilkenny, between Kilkenny and London, in what was their first meeting in a final in five years. Kilkenny won the match by 3-09 to 3-05 to claim their third championship title overall and a first title since 1946.

Results

All-Ireland Junior Hurling Championship

All-Ireland semi-finals

All-Ireland home final

All-Ireland final

References

Junior
All-Ireland Junior Hurling Championship